Daniel Atienza Urendez (born 22 September 1974 in Moudon, Switzerland) is a former Spanish professional road bicycle racer who rode for UCI ProTeam Cofidis from 2001 to 2005.

Major results 

1996
 1st Stage 7, Circuito Montañés
1999
 12th Overall, Tour de Romandie
2000
 1st Rominger Classic
 10th Overall, Tour de Suisse
 29th Overall, Tour de France
2001
 13th Overall, Tour de Suisse
 30th Overall, Tour de France
2002
 1st Mountains Competition, Midi Libre
 15th Overall, Volta a Catalunya
2003
 9th Overall, Volta a Catalunya
2004
 10th Overall, Volta a Catalunya
2005
 9th Overall, Tour de Romandie
 13th Overall, Tour de Suisse
 14th Overall, Giro d'Italia
 17th Overall, Vuelta a España

External links 

1974 births
Living people
Spanish male cyclists
People from Broye-Vully District
Sportspeople from the canton of Vaud
Swiss male cyclists